Whodunnit? is an American murder mystery-based reality television show broadcast on ABC. The series premiered on June 23, 2013, and concluded its first season on August 18, 2013. The series was not renewed for a second season. The series is hosted by Gildart Jackson, who plays the mansion's butler, Giles.

In each episode, the competitors witness a "murder" (staged by production) committed secretly by one of their numbers, and are instructed to find clues to how the murder was done and the identity of the murderer. Players are privately quizzed on how well they have deduced the mystery; the player with the lowest score becomes the next victim of the murderer, eliminating them from the game.

Format
The series follows 13 guests, one of whom is secretly the "killer" posing as a contestant in the game, living in a Beverly Hills mansion named Rue Manor. They are guided by the butler, Giles (Gildart Jackson) who also acts as the show's host. Within the show's fiction, the guests, along with Giles and two maids, are trapped by the killer within the house grounds until they determine who the killer is. An early episode shows that Giles is wearing an ankle monitor that forbids him from leaving. In many ways, Giles acts as a puppet for the killer; the killer sends messages to Giles, who reads them to the surviving guests.

Each episode, at least one guest is "murdered" (through staged events by production) by the killer, either while the victim is alone or through pre-arranged circumstances while the remaining guests are congregated as to avoid revealing their identity. After the shock of the event, Giles offers the remaining guests an opportunity to search one of three areas (usually the crime scene, the last known whereabouts, or the morgue containing the victim's body) to discover clues about how the murder was carried out. Guests are free to select which area to search, though they are allowed access to only one area with a limited amount of time, and are confined to the bounds set by production, sometimes marked off with police tape. Guests then participate in a riddle challenge that leads them in a competitive search through the mansion. The guest who is able to complete the challenge receives an additional clue that may greatly help in solving how the murder was committed.

Guests are given limited opportunities to congregate, where they can share, withhold, or lie about whatever information they find from their investigations and riddle challenges; at all other times, guests are isolated from each other. On the show, this led to the ad hoc formation of two informal teams that tried to assure information was withheld from the other team, in an attempt to assure their own team's advancement to the next round. Though the murders and riddle challenges are presented as having been masterminded by the killer, in reality the guest playing the killer is as unaware of upcoming deaths and challenges as the other guests, and is not given any information from production about the larger social game.

Later, guests are individually taken to the mansion library where, in monologue, they describe to the unseen killer how they believe the murder took place and make an accusation as to who the killer is. However, each elimination is actually based on the guests' performance on an unaired written quiz (similar to The Mole) that objectively assesses the accuracy of their theories. The quiz consists of 12-15 short answer questions about the investigation sites and the riddle challenge; ties are broken based on the time taken to complete the quiz.

During dinner, Giles presents a message from the killer. The message states which guest had the most correct theory and is subsequently spared from being the killer's next victim. The message then fully explains how the murder was completed. After this, Giles hands an envelope to each remaining guest. Those receiving cards with the word "Spared" performed well enough to advance to the next episode. The lowest-scoring guest, along with at least one other low-scoring guest will receive a card with the word "Scared." As noted above, the guest playing the killer is as unaware of how the murders are committed as the rest of the guests are, and so may also receive a "Scared" card as well; however, the killer cannot be eliminated. The lowest-scoring guest is then eliminated from the competition by having been discovered to be "murdered" by the killer in some way at the end of each episode as a Cliffhanger, thus introducing the murder to be solved in the next episode.

In the finale, the final three guests (the killer and the two remaining players) compete in a multi-part riddle and memory challenge based on elements from all of the previous murders. The first player to complete this challenge is directed to a final room to confront the killer, while the last player is sent elsewhere and subsequently eliminated. The killer confesses his or her identity to the last guest and congratulates them for winning the game. That guest leaves the estate with US$250,000.

Production
ABC picked up Whodunnit? for nine episodes on February 6, 2013.  As he was also the creator of the successful CSI franchise, creator and executive producer Anthony Zuiker was able to bring the crew and set pieces from the CSI series to assist in the production of the series.

The first victim, Sheri, was not an actual contestant, rather she was planted in the cast with the knowledge that she would be first one "killed," in order set up the "murder" to be solved in the first episode.

Each of the contestants was asked prior to the start of taping if he or she would like to play the killer; the guest ultimately chosen received a guaranteed stipend. The killer's identity was a well-kept secret during taping, to the extent that even executive producer Zuiker didn't know who the killer was for the first eight episodes.

The show has a $750,000 per day budget, with approximately 250 people involved in the show's production each day. This included award-winning makeup artists to help make the "deaths" of the guests look authentic. Stunt doubles are used in the show's more dangerous scenes. A female stunt double shaved her head to play Dontae, due to his small size, as he was set on fire during his death scene. The mountain lion that was present during Don's elimination cost $5,000 per hour, and a dummy was used in place of Don in shots where they both appeared.

Each episode took about 3 days to shoot: the first day revolved around the investigation, the second day included the riddle challenge and dinner ceremony, and the third day was spent with each of the guests doing solo interviews. After each murder, guests would have to play their own "corpse" in the morgue, though after the team had finished their examination, the murdered guest was allowed some brief time to say goodbye to the team.

In a post-show interview, Cris confirmed that she did not know any information the other guests did not, as she could have rigged the outcome of the show if she did. She stated that the only direction she ever received from the producers was to stop winning riddles after she had won two in a row. She also confirmed that there were no true clues to identifying the killer on the show, and that the producers chose to highlight her coincidental experience with guns and horses (in their respective episodes) to serve as hints for the viewer.

Broadcast
The first season of Whodunnit? premiered on June 23, 2013 on ABC. It aired nine episodes in the Sundays at 9:00 p.m. Eastern/8:00 p.m. Central time slot, with the finale airing on August 18, 2013. It was not renewed for a second season.

Contestants
The guests are:

Game history

The chart combines each guest's progress through the game with the guest he or she accused of being the killer in each episode. There is no correlation between the guests' suspicions of the killer's identity and who was eliminated in any particular episode.

The irrelevance of the killer's identity (despite the title of the show) is epitomized by Lindsey's row, as she correctly identified the killer from week one, but failed to succeed in the final challenge, resulting in her elimination. Likewise, Kam, the winner, never once guessed the killer's identity.

Color key
 – Spared - The guest had the most correct theory and survived. (If letters are blue, that means they also solved a riddle). 
 - Riddle Solver - The guest was able to solve a riddle, but did not have the most correct theory
 – Spared - The guest performed well enough to survive.
 – Scared - The guest was marked for possible elimination but survived.
 – Scared - The guest was marked for possible elimination, had the least correct theory, and was thus killed.
 – The guest was the runner-up and was killed. 
 – The guest was revealed to be the killer.
 – The guest won the competition.

Episodes
Each "murder" is listed under the episode in which its events are investigated, although brief footage of each murder (except for the first and penultimate) is shown at the end of the preceding episode as to reveal who was eliminated.

Reception

Critical reception
Whodunnit? received generally mixed reviews from critics.

The series received 43 out of 100 at Metacritic.

Varietys Brian Lowry thought that the show was "especially brain-numbing", as the mysteries weren't suspenseful or intriguing. Mary McNamara of the Los Angeles Times said that it was "not terribly exciting" and that the premiere episode "didn't leave enough time for at-home deduction or competitive theories." Allison Keene of The Hollywood Reporter thought that the series generally ended up "either painful or unintentionally funny". She found the show to be a little pathetic, because "of how little amateurs really know and how ridiculous it sounds to regurgitate half-remembered forensic jargon".

Ratings
Whodunnit premiered to a 1.3 rating in the Adults 18-49 demographic and 4.05 million viewers. Ratings analysts viewed this result as soft, but still decent. In week two, however, it fell 23% to a 1.0 rating. It stayed near that point until the end of the season, when it finished with a season-high rating of 1.4.

Confusion over murders of guests
After the first episode aired, some audience members at home were confused about whether the murders were actually real. On the official website, the series' producers reveal fun facts about each episode, describing in more detail how the staged murder scenes were shot. In addition, viewers can watch exit interviews with the eliminated guests.  Beginning with the second episode, each episode has ended with that week's "victim" (the guest eliminated the previous week), still in makeup and costume, humorously commenting on what it was like to play the role of the killer's victim.  Executive producer Zuiker confirmed that this was added in post-production in response to the unexpected confusion in order to reemphasize the fictitious nature of the premise. The opening narration of the final episode reiterated that the contestants were solving "fictitious crimes," and even explicitly mentioned the confusion.

Companion books
A companion book series, also titled Whodunnit?, is available in digital format.  It is written by Anthony Zuiker and published by Hyperion Books. The first book, Whodunnit?: Murder in Mystery Manor was released on June 16, 2013. A second book, Whodunnit?: Murder on Mystery Island was released on August 27, 2013.

The series is a fictitious season of the events happening in the television show, with Giles, as the main character. It is stated in the books that whenever he gets a job, it will turn out to ultimately (whether the job is "Hijacked" or not) be for a extremely rich, yet utterly psychopahtic serial killer wishing to enact another "Season", trapping him in the location where he currently works, and forcing him to host on his/her behalf, lest they kill him and or any other staff members that refuse to go along with the deadly game they have set up.

See also
Murder in Small Town X
Escape the Night
The Mole (TV series)
Killer Camp

References

External links
 
 
 Whodunnit? at TV by the Numbers

2010s American reality television series
2010s American mystery television series
2013 American television series debuts
2013 American television series endings
American Broadcasting Company original programming
English-language television shows
Television series created by Anthony E. Zuiker
Television shows about death games
Television shows filmed in California